The boxing program of the 2008 Summer Olympics in Beijing, China was held at the Workers Indoor Arena.

Medals were awarded in eleven events, with each event corresponding to a recognized weight division of male boxers.  The 2008 games were the last Olympic boxing competition to exclude women, as the International Olympic Committee approved the introduction of female boxing events for the 2012 London Olympics.

Like other Olympic combat sports, two bronze medals are awarded; in the case of boxing, both losing semi-finalists receive a bronze medal, with no further play-off. As a result, the quarter-final essentially equates to a bronze medal match, a semi-final to a silver medal match, and the final to a gold medal match. 44 medals are therefore available, 22 of which are bronze medals.

Medal summary

Medal table

Events

Light flyweight (−48 kg)
Flyweight (48–51 kg)
Bantamweight (51–54 kg)
Featherweight (54–57 kg)
Lightweight (57–60 kg)
Light welterweight (60–64 kg)
Welterweight (64–69 kg)
Middleweight (69–75 kg)
Light heavyweight (75–81 kg)
Heavyweight (81–91 kg)
Super heavyweight (+91 kg)

Qualifying criteria

A National Olympic Committee (NOC) may enter up to 1 athlete in each event. Nine places will be reserved for the host nation, from which it will choose 6 places maximum, while the remaining places will be allocated to the Tripartite Invitation Commission. For each athlete from the host NOC who qualifies through the AIBA World Amateur Boxing Championships, the host nation will lose a guaranteed place.

Qualification events are:
2007 World Amateur Boxing Championships – October 23 – November 3 (8 athletes for −81 kg categories, 4 athletes for +81 kg)
Continental Olympic Qualifying Events (during 2008, two events in Africa, America, Asia and Europe)
2008 Oceania Boxing Championships

The quota awarded to each of the continents is as follows:

* Two additional places will be awarded by Tripartite Invitation Commission, so the athlete quota will be 286

Participating nations

References

Boxing at the 2008 Summer Olympics

External links
Boxing – Official Results Book

 
2008 Summer Olympics events
Olympics
2008